Sir Stirling Craufurd Moss  (17 September 1929 – 12 April 2020) was a British Formula One driver. An inductee into the International Motorsports Hall of Fame, he won 212 of the 529 races he entered across several different motorsports competitions and he has been described as "the greatest driver never to win the Formula One World Championship". In a seven-year span between 1955 and 1961 Moss finished in second place four times and in third place three times.

Early life
Moss was born in London to amateur racing drivers Alfred and Aileen Moss (née Craufurd). His grandfather was Jewish; and from a family that changed their surname from Moses to Moss. He was brought up at Long White Cloud house on the south bank of the River Thames. His father was an amateur racing driver who had come 16th in the 1924 Indianapolis 500, and his mother had also been involved in motorsport, entering into hillclimbs at the wheel of a Singer Nine. Moss was a gifted horse rider as was his younger sister, Pat Moss, who went on to become a successful rally driver.

Moss was educated at several independent schools: Shrewsbury House School, Clewer Manor Junior School and Haileybury and Imperial Service College. He disliked school and did not get good grades. At Haileybury, he was subjected to anti-semitic bullying due to his Jewish roots. He concealed the bullying from his parents and used it as "motivation to succeed". Moss received his first car, an Austin 7, from his father at the age of nine, and drove it on the fields around Long White Cloud. He purchased his own car at age 15 after he obtained a driving licence.

Racing career

Moss raced from 1948 to 1962, winning 212 of the 529 races he entered, including 16 Formula One Grands Prix. He competed in as many as 62 races in one year and drove 84 different makes of car over the course of his career. He preferred to race British cars, stating, "It is better to lose honourably in a British car than to win in a foreign one". At Vanwall, he was instrumental in breaking the German and Italian stranglehold on F1. He kept his record of the most Formula One Grands Prix victories by an English driver until 1991 when Nigel Mansell overtook him.

1948–1954
Moss began his career at the wheel of his father's 328 BMW, DPX 653. Moss was one of the Cooper Car Company's first customers, using winnings from competing in horse-riding events to pay the deposit on a Cooper 500 in 1948. He then persuaded his father, who opposed his son's racing career and wanted him to become a dentist, to let him buy it. He soon demonstrated his natural talent and ability with numerous wins at both the national and international levels, and continued to compete in Formula Three, with Coopers and Kiefts, after he had progressed to more senior categories.

His first major international race victory came on the eve of his 21st birthday at the wheel of a Jaguar XK120 in the 1950 RAC Tourist Trophy in Northern Ireland. He went on to win the race six more times, in 1951 (with a Jaguar C-Type), 1955 (with a Mercedes-Benz 300SLR), 1958 and 1959 (with an Aston Martin DBR1), and 1960 and 1961 (with a Ferrari 250 GT). Enzo Ferrari, the founder of Ferrari, approached Moss and offered him a Formula Two car to drive at the 1951 Bari Grand Prix before a full-season in 1952. Moss and his father went to Apulia only to find out that the Ferrari car was to be driven by Piero Taruffi and were incensed.

Also a competent rally driver, Moss was one of three people to have won a Coupe d'Or for three consecutive penalty-free runs on the Alpine Rally. He finished second in the 1952 Monte Carlo Rally; driving a Sunbeam-Talbot 90 with Desmond Scannell and John Cooper as his co-drivers.

In 1954, he became the first non-American to win the 12 Hours of Sebring, sharing the Cunningham team's 1.5-liter O.S.C.A. MT4 with Bill Lloyd.

In 1953 Mercedes-Benz racing boss Alfred Neubauer had spoken to Moss's manager, Ken Gregory, about the possibility of Moss's joining Mercedes. Having seen him do well in a relatively uncompetitive car, and wanting to see how he would perform in a better one, Neubauer suggested that Moss buy a Maserati for the 1954 season. He bought a Maserati 250F, and although the car's unreliability prevented him from scoring high amounts of points in the 1954 Drivers' Championship, he qualified alongside the Mercedes front runners several times and performed well in the races. He achieved his first Formula One victory when he won the Oulton Park International Gold Cup.

In the Italian Grand Prix he passed both drivers who were regarded as the best in Formula One at the time —Juan Manuel Fangio in his Mercedes and Alberto Ascari in his Ferrari — and took the lead of the race. Ascari retired with engine problems, and Moss led until lap 68 when his engine also failed. Fangio took the victory, and Moss had to push his Maserati to the finish line. Neubauer, already impressed when Moss had tested a Mercedes-Benz W196 at Hockenheim, promptly signed him for the 1955 season.

1955
Moss's first World Championship victory came at the 1955 British Grand Prix, a race he was also the first British driver to win. Leading a 1–2–3–4 finish for Mercedes, it was the first time he had beaten Fangio, his teammate, rival, friend and mentor. It has been suggested that Fangio allowed Moss to win in front of his home crowd. Moss himself asked Fangio this repeatedly, and Fangio would always reply with: "No. You were just better than me that day." The same year, Moss also won the RAC Tourist Trophy, the Targa Florio (with Peter Collins) and the Mille Miglia.

Mille Miglia
In 1955 Moss won Italy's one-thousand-mile Mille Miglia road race, an achievement that Doug Nye described as the "most iconic single day's drive in motor racing history." His co-driver was motor racing journalist Denis Jenkinson, who prepared a set of pace notes for Moss, and the two completed the race in ten hours and seven minutes. Motor Trend headlined it as "The Most Epic Drive Ever". Before the race, he had taken a pill given to him by Fangio, and he has commented that although he did not know what was in it, "Dexedrine and Benzedrine were commonly used in rallies. The object was simply to keep awake, like wartime bomber crews." After the win, he spent the night and the following day driving his girlfriend to Cologne.

1956–1962

Moss won the Nassau Cup at the 1956 and 1957 Bahamas Speed Week. Also in 1957 he won on the longest circuit ever to hold a Formula One Grand Prix, the  Pescara Circuit, where, yet again, he demonstrated his mastery in long-distance racing. The event lasted three hours and Moss beat Fangio, who started from pole position, by approximately 3 minutes.

In 1958, Moss's forward-thinking attitude made waves in the racing world. Moss won the first race of the season in a rear-engined F1 car, which became the common design by 1961. At Monza that year, he raced in the Maserati 420M in the Race of Two Worlds, the first single-seater car in Europe to be sponsored by a non-racing brand—the Eldorado Ice Cream Company. This was the first case in Europe of contemporary sponsorship, with the ice cream maker's colors replacing the ones assigned by the FIA.

Moss's sporting attitude cost him the 1958 Formula One World Championship. When rival Mike Hawthorn was threatened with a penalty after the Portuguese Grand Prix, Moss defended him. Hawthorn was accused of reversing on the track after spinning and stalling his car on an uphill section. Moss had shouted advice to Hawthorn to steer downhill, against traffic, to bump-start the car. Moss's quick thinking, and his defence of Hawthorn before the stewards, preserved Hawthorn's 6 points for finishing in second place. Hawthorn went on to beat Moss for the championship title by one point, even though he had won only one race that year to Moss's four. Moss's loss in the championship could also be attributed to an error in communication between his pit crew and the driver at one race. A point was given for the fastest lap in each race, and the crew signaled "HAWT REC" meaning Hawthorn had set a record lap. Moss read this as "HAWT REG" and thought that Hawthorn was making regular laps, so did not try to set a fast lap. The crew was supposed to signal the time of the lap, so Moss would know what he had to beat.

Moss was as gifted in sports cars as in Grand Prix cars. To his victories in the Tourist Trophy, the Sebring 12 Hours and the Mille Miglia he added three consecutive wins from 1958–1960 in the 1000 km Nürburgring, the first two in an Aston Martin (in which he did most of the driving), and the third in a Maserati Tipo 61, co-driving with Dan Gurney. The pair lost time when an oil hose blew off, but despite the wet-weather, they made up the time and took first place.

In the 1960 Formula One season, Moss won the Monaco Grand Prix in Rob Walker's Coventry-Climax-powered Lotus 18. Seriously injured in an accident at the Burnenville curve during practice for the Belgian Grand Prix, he missed the next three races but recovered sufficiently to win the final one of the season, the United States Grand Prix.

For the 1961 Formula One season, run under new 1.5-litre rules, Enzo Ferrari fielded the Ferrari 156 with an all-new V6 engine. Moss's Climax-engined Lotus was comparatively underpowered, but he won the 1961 Monaco Grand Prix by 3.6 seconds, beating the Ferraris of Richie Ginther, Wolfgang von Trips, and Phil Hill, and he went on to win the 1961 German Grand Prix.

In 1962, he crashed his Lotus in the Glover Trophy. The accident put him in a coma for a month, and for six months the left side of his body was paralysed. He recovered, but retired from professional racing after a test session in a Lotus 19 the following year, when he lapped a few tenths of a second slower than before. He felt that he had not regained his instinctive command of the car after recovering from the coma. He had been runner-up in the Drivers' Championship four years in a row, from 1955-1958, and third from 1959-1961.

Speed records

1950
At the Autodrome de Montlhéry, a steeply banked oval track near Paris, Moss and Leslie Johnson took turns at the wheel of the latter's Jaguar XK120 to average  for 24 hours, including stops for fuel and tyres.

1952

Revisiting Montlhéry, Moss was one of a four-driver team, led by Johnson, who drove a factory-owned Jaguar XK120 fixed-head coupé for 7 days and nights at the French track.

1957
In August Moss broke five International Class F records in the purpose-built MG EX181 at Bonneville Salt Flats. The streamlined, supercharged car's speed for the flying kilometer was 245.64 mph, which was the average of two runs in opposite directions.

Broadcasting career
Away from driving, in 1962 he acted as a colour commentator for ABC's Wide World of Sports for Formula One and NASCAR races. He eventually left ABC in 1980. Moss narrated the official 1988 Formula One season review along with Tony Jardine.

Moss also narrated the popular children's series Roary the Racing Car, which stars Peter Kay.

Return to racing

Although ostensibly retired from racing since 1962, Moss did make a number of one-off appearances in professional motorsport events in the following two decades. He also competed in the 1974 London-Sahara-Munich World Cup Rally in a Mercedes-Benz, but retired from the event in the Algerian Sahara. The Holden Torana he shared with Jack Brabham in the 1976 Bathurst 1000 was hit from behind on the grid and eventually retired with engine failure. Moss, at the wheel of the Torana when the V8 engine let go, was criticised by other drivers for staying on the racing line for over ⅔ of the 6.172 km long circuit while returning to the pits as the car was dropping large amounts of oil onto the road. He also shared a Volkswagen Golf GTI with Denny Hulme in the 1979 Benson & Hedges 500 at Pukekohe Park Raceway in New Zealand.

In 1980 he made a comeback to regular competition, in the British Saloon Car Championship with the works-backed GTi Engineering Audi team. For the 1980 season Moss was the team's number two driver to team co-owner Richard Lloyd. For the 1981 season Moss stayed with Audi, as the team moved to Tom Walkinshaw Racing management, driving alongside Martin Brundle.

Throughout his retirement he raced in events for historic cars, driving on behalf of and at the invitation of others, as well as campaigning his own OSCA FS 372 and other vehicles. In 2004, as part of its promotion for the new SLR, Mercedes-Benz reunited Moss with the 300 SLR "No. 722" in which he won the Mille Miglia nearly 50 years earlier.  One reporter who rode with Moss that day noted that the 75-year-old driver was "so good . . . that even old and crippled [he was] still better than nearly everyone else".  On 9 June 2011 during qualifying for the Le Mans Legends race, Moss announced on Radio Le Mans that he had finally retired from racing, saying that he had scared himself that afternoon. He was 81.

Post racing career

Lister Cars announced the building for sale of the Lister Knobbly Stirling Moss at the Royal Automobile Club in London in June 2016. The car is built to the exact specification of the 1958 model, is the only magnesium-bodied car in the world, and is the only car that was ever endorsed by Moss. Brian Lister invited Moss to drive for Lister on three separate occasions, at Goodwood in 1954, Silverstone in 1958 and at Sebring in 1959, and to celebrate these races, 10 special edition lightweight Lister Knobbly cars are being built. The company announced that the cars will be available for both road and race use, and Moss would personally be handing over each car.

Honours
In 1990, Moss was inducted into the International Motorsports Hall of Fame.

In the New Year Honours 2000 List, Moss was made a Knight Bachelor for services to motor racing. On 21 March 2000, he was knighted by Prince Charles, standing in for the Queen, who was on an official visit to Australia.

He received the 2005 Segrave Trophy.

In 2006, Moss was awarded the FIA gold medal in recognition of his outstanding contribution to motorsport.

In December 2008, McLaren-Mercedes unveiled their final model of the Mercedes-Benz SLR McLaren.

In 2016, in an academic paper that reported a mathematical modelling study that assessed the relative influence of driver and machine, Moss was ranked the 29th best Formula One driver of all time.

Following Moss's death the Kinrara Trophy race at the Goodwood Revival meeting was renamed in his honour. It is a race for  GT cars that competed before 1963.

Biographies 
In 1957, Moss published an autobiography called In the Track Of Speed, first published by Muller, London.
In 1963, motorsport author and commentator Ken Purdy published a biographical book entitled All But My Life about Moss (first published by William Kimber & Co, London), based on material gathered through interviews with Moss.
In 2015, when he was aged 85, Moss published a second autobiography, entitled My Racing Life, written with motor sports writer Simon Taylor. In 2016, Philip Porter published the first volume of Stirling Moss – The Definitive Biography covering the period from birth up to the end of 1955, one of Moss's greatest years.

Popular culture

During his driving career, Moss was one of the most recognised celebrities in Britain, leading to many media appearances. In March 1958, Moss was a guest challenger on the TV panel show What's My Line? (episode with Anita Ekberg). In 1959 he was the subject of the TV programme This Is Your Life. On 12 June the following year he was interviewed by John Freeman on Face to Face; Freeman later said that he had thought before the interview that Moss was a playboy, but in their meeting he showed "cold, precise, clinical judgement... a man who could live so close to the edge of death and danger, and trust entirely to his own judgement. This appealed to me". Moss also appeared as himself in the 1964 film The Beauty Jungle, and was one of several celebrities with cameo appearances in the 1967 version of the James Bond film Casino Royale. He played Evelyn Tremble's (Peter Sellers) driver.

For many years during and after his career, the rhetorical phrase "Who do you think you are, Stirling Moss?" was supposedly the standard question all British policemen asked speeding motorists. Moss relates he himself was once stopped for speeding and asked just that; he reports the traffic officer had some difficulty believing him. Moss was the subject of a cartoon biography in the magazine Private Eye that said he was interested in cars, women and sex, in that order. The cartoon, drawn by Willie Rushton, showed him continually crashing, having his driving licence revoked and finally "hosting television programmes on subjects he knows nothing about". It also made reference to the amnesia Moss suffered from as a result of head injuries sustained in the crash at Goodwood in 1962. Although there were complaints to the magazine about the cartoons, Moss rang Private Eye to ask if he could use it as a Christmas card.

He was one of the few drivers of his era to create a brand from his name for licensing purposes, which was launched when his website was revamped in 2009 with improved content. In 2004, Moss was a supporter of the UK Independence Party.

Moss was a Mercedes-Benz Brand Ambassador, having kept a close relationship with the brand, and remained an enthusiast and collector of the brand, which includes the Mercedes-Benz W113, Mercedes-Benz SLR McLaren Stirling Moss among others.

Personal life and death

Moss was married three times. His first wife was Katie Molson; an heir to the Canadian brewer Molson. They were married in 1957 and separated three years later. His second wife was the American public relations executive Elaine Barbarino. They were married in 1964 and divorced in 1968. Their daughter Allison was born in 1967. His third wife was Susie Paine, the daughter of an old friend. They were married from 1980 until his death in 2020. Their son Elliot was born in 1980.

In April 1960, Moss was found guilty of dangerous driving. He was fined £50 and banned from driving for one year after an incident near Chetwynd, Shropshire, when he was test-driving a Mini.

Moss was an accomplished woodworker and craftsman, and participated in the design and construction of several of his own homes.

Moss's 80th birthday, on 17 September 2009, fell on the eve of the Goodwood Revival and Lord March celebrated with an 80-car parade on each of the three days. Moss drove a different car each day: a Mercedes-Benz W196 (an open-wheel variant), the Lotus 18 in which he had won the 1961 Monaco GP, and an Aston Martin DBR1.

On 7 March 2010, Moss broke both ankles and four bones in a foot, and also chipped four vertebrae and suffered skin lesions, when he plunged down a lift shaft at his home. In December 2016, he was admitted to hospital in Singapore with a serious chest infection. As a result of this illness and a subsequent lengthy recovery period, Moss announced his retirement from public life in January 2018.

Moss died at his home in Mayfair, London, on 12 April 2020, aged 90, after a long illness.

Racing record

Career highlights

Complete Formula One World Championship results
(key) (Races in bold indicate pole position; races in italics indicate fastest lap)

 † Indicates shared drive with Hans Herrmann and Karl Kling.
 * Indicates shared drive with Cesare Perdisa.
 ‡ Indicates shared drive with Tony Brooks.
 [a]  After Moss retired from the race he took over the car of Trintignant. Both drivers did not receive any points for their shared drive.

Non-championship results
(key) (Races in bold indicate pole position)
(Races in italics indicate fastest lap)

Complete 24 Hours of Le Mans results

Complete 12 Hours of Sebring results

Complete 12 Hours of Reims results

Complete Mille Miglia results

Complete Rallye de Monte Carlo results

Complete Bathurst 1000 results

Complete British Saloon Car Championship results
(key) (Races in bold indicate pole position; races in italics indicate fastest lap.)

† Events with 2 races staged for the different classes.

References

External links 

 
 
 Grand Prix History – Hall of Fame, Stirling Moss
 Stirling Moss profile at The 500 Owners Association
 BBC Face to Face interview with Stirling Moss and John Freeman, broadcast 12 June 1960
 
 

1929 births
2020 deaths
12 Hours of Sebring drivers
24 Hours of Le Mans drivers
BBC Sports Personality of the Year winners
Bonneville 200 MPH Club members
BRDC Gold Star winners
Brighton Speed Trials people
British Racing Partnership Formula One drivers
British Touring Car Championship drivers
Connaught Formula One drivers
Cooper Formula One drivers
English Formula One drivers
English people of Jewish descent
English racing drivers
ERA Formula One drivers
Formula One race winners
Formula One team owners
Hersham and Walton Motors Formula One drivers
International Motorsports Hall of Fame inductees
Knights Bachelor
Maserati Formula One drivers
Mercedes-Benz Formula One drivers
Officers of the Order of the British Empire
People educated at Haileybury and Imperial Service College
People from West Kensington
People in sports awarded knighthoods
Rob Walker Racing Team Formula One drivers
Sportspeople from London
Segrave Trophy recipients
Vanwall Formula One drivers
World Sportscar Championship drivers
12 Hours of Reims drivers